Arif Dwi Pangestu (born 25 March 2004) is an Indonesian recurve archer. He competed in the men's individual event at the 2017 World Archery Youth Championships  in Rosario, Argentina. He represented Indonesia at the 2019 Southeast Asian Games, in the men's individual recurve and team category, and he win the gold medal at team category, together with Riau Ega Agatha and Hendra Purnama. He competed in the Men's individual archery event of the 2020 Olympics reaching rank 32.

References

External links
 

2004 births
Living people
People from Yogyakarta
Sportspeople from Special Region of Yogyakarta
Indonesian male archers
Archers at the 2020 Summer Olympics
Olympic archers of Indonesia
Competitors at the 2019 Southeast Asian Games
Competitors at the 2021 Southeast Asian Games
Southeast Asian Games gold medalists for Indonesia
Southeast Asian Games medalists in archery
21st-century Indonesian people
Islamic Solidarity Games medalists in archery